Aketi Airport  is an airstrip serving the town of Aketi in Bas-Uele Province, Democratic Republic of the Congo. The runway is southeast of the town, across the Itimbiri River, and is accessed by ferry.

See also

Transport in the Democratic Republic of the Congo
List of airports in the Democratic Republic of the Congo

References

External links
 OpenStreetMap - Aketi Airport
 OurAirports - Aketi Airport
 Aketi Airport
 

Airports in Bas-Uélé Province